, also known as 2ch, Channel 2, and sometimes retrospectively as 2ch.net, was an anonymous Japanese textboard founded in 1999 by Hiroyuki Nishimura. Described in 2007 as "Japan's most popular online community", the site had a level of influence comparable to that of traditional mass media such as television, radio, and magazines.

The site was hosted and had its domain registration provided by Jim Watkins, based in San Francisco, California. In 2009, ownership of the site was transferred to Singapore-based Packet Monster Inc., under which Nishimura remained in control. In February 2014, Watkins seized the 2ch.net domain, taking full control over the website and assuming the role of site administrator.

2channel and its successors are more controversial than other social media in Japan; they are extremely popular among Japan's extreme right-wing, known as the netto-uyoku, who post xenophobic comments, often targeting Koreans. Defamation is of particular concern; by August 2008, Nishimura had received more than one hundred lawsuits for defamatory comments left on the website. Announcements of crimes also have drawn scrutiny towards 2channel and its successors. In 2012, 2channel was accused by the Tokyo Metropolitan Police of allowing its platform to be used by amphetamine dealers, although no charges were filed.

In September 2007, 2channel averaged over 2.4 million posts per day. As of July 2020, 5channel had 1,031 boards receiving around 2.7 million posts per day on weekends, with no growth since March 2016. Meanwhile, 2ch.sc then had 826 boards receiving around 5,700 posts daily.



History

Predecessors 
Ayashii World was the first large anonymous web bulletin board in Japan, while Amezou originated the more familiar "textboard" concept wherein threads are displayed chronologically, with new comments bumping old threads to the top, rather than in a branching tree. Ayashii World closed in 1998, leading most of its former users to go to Amezou; Nishimura advertised 2channel in a post on Amezou in May 1999, calling it "Amezou's second channel". From June, Amezou became increasingly unable to handle the load on its servers, until its host shut it down after threats against Amezou's anonymous owner which contained his dox were posted on it.

Early history 
2channel was founded on 30 May 1999 in a college apartment in Conway, Arkansas on the campus of University of Central Arkansas by Hiroyuki Nishimura. Success came quickly; many of Amezou's users began using it as soon as it opened. When compared with other bulletin boards, 2channel's technology wasn't much different; what led to its success was instead its being an "outlet for unfettered expression"; by being hosted in the United States, 2channel was able to bypass more restrictive Japanese censorship rules, while still being accessible from Japan. The site also enjoyed greater immunity from legal action within Japan due to the location of its servers. By 2002, Google said that the most searched word in Japan was "2channel". By 2004, 2channel was already the largest internet forum in Japan.

The name "2channel" is a reference to VHF channel 2, the default setting for the RF modulators used in earlier-generation game consoles (such as Nintendo's Family Computer) when connecting to Japanese television sets. Where Amezou was originally meant to be "channel one", 2channel was meant to be "channel two". The site's iconic jar logo is a reference to deprecatory remarks some former users of Ayashii World would make about 2channel early on in the site's history, likening it to a spittoon. Nishimura took this nickname and adopted it as the site's logo by 2002.

Jim Watkins, an ex-US army non-commissioned officer (sergeant first class), domain name registrar, and dedicated hosting service provider, hosted 2channel since at least 2004 through various corporate identities, including Big-server.com Inc., Pacific Internet Exchange LLC and N. T. Technology Inc. Before 2channel, Watkins' company primarily specialized in using servers and domains in the United States to serve uncensored pornographic content to users in Japan.

Ownership transfer and government scrutiny 
On 2 January 2009, Nishimura claimed to have transferred ownership of 2channel to Packet Monster Inc., a company based in Chinatown, Singapore, and to no longer be involved in the site's management. However, Nishimura was charged with violating Japanese narcotic control laws anyway on 20 December 2012. As part of their case, the Tokyo Metropolitan Police Department (MPD) claimed Nishimura remained involved in 2channel's operations, alleging Packet Monster Inc. is a shell company. On 19 March 2013, the Public Prosecutors Office decided not to prosecute the case.

In August 2013, the Tokyo Regional Taxation Bureau declared in a tax audit that Nishimura had failed to declare  worth of website revenue which should have been taxed between 2009 and 2012, years in which he financially benefited from Packet Monster Inc.; Nishimura settled the matter by paying the owed tax, .

Personal information leak 
In August 2013, a hacker using the name   the personal details (including names, addresses, and phone numbers) and credit card numbers of thousands of 2channel users who had used 2channel's paid services into the public domain, exposing the anonymous profiles of various high level personas such as politicians and writers, including an attorney involved in 2channel cases, Takahiro Karasawa, and a staff member of AKB48. More than 74,000 users had their personal information exposed by the leak.

At the time of the leak, Watkins apologized on behalf of N. T. Technology, Inc., saying he was the victim of a "cyber attack" and that "some data [of my] customers was compromised."

Domain seizure and split 

On 19 February 2014, Jim Watkins, as chairman of N.T. Technology, Inc., 2channel's domain registrar, seized 2channel's domain. He took full control over the website, relieved Nishimura of all power, and assumed the role of website administrator. Watkins made the kako rogu free to all users shortly after assuming control.

Watkins claimed that Nishimura had failed to pay him money owed which led to the seizure as a way to cover Nishimura's debts, while Nishimura claimed that he had in fact paid everything owed and that the domain transfer was an illegal domain hijacking. In a Q&A session on 4chan shortly after becoming the site's owner, Nishimura claimed that 2channel was stolen by Watkins.

Nishimura has attempted to repossess the domain both through WIPO's Uniform Domain-Name Dispute-Resolution Policy and through the Japanese court system. Through the Japan Patent Office, Nishimura owns the trademark "2channel", though the WIPO refused to intervene on his behalf on account of that, suggesting the parties go to court instead as it was not, in its view, a case of "cybersquatting" but rather a "business dispute".

Ron Watkins, Jim's son, in 2016 registered the trademark "5channel" in Japan. On 1 October 2017, 2ch.net began redirecting to 5ch.net, a domain owned by Loki Technology, Inc. The chairman of Loki Technology Inc. is also Jim Watkins; his wife, Liziel, is the treasurer and majority shareholder. According to a press release, the name was changed to 5channel to avoid potential legal issues due to Nishimura's ownership of the "2channel" trademark.

Culture

Due to its large number of boards, the types of information exchanged on 2channel are very diverse. There are boards for topics as diverse as sports, sex, celebrity gossip, computer programming and ongoing earthquakes; even some academic research has gotten its start on 2channel.

Anonymous posting
One of the most distinctive features of 2channel is its use of anonymous posting. Nishimura explained his reasons for preferring anonymity online to USC Annenberg's Japan Media Review thus:

If there is a user ID attached to a user, a discussion tends to become a criticizing game. On the other hand, under the anonymous system, even though your opinion/information is criticized, you don't know with whom to be upset. Also with a user ID, those who participate in the site for a long time tend to have authority, and it becomes difficult for a user to disagree with them. Under a perfectly anonymous system, you can say, "it's boring," if it is actually boring. All information is treated equally; only an accurate argument will work.

However, a frequent criticism directed toward anonymous textboards like 2channel, most notably by Kazuhiko Nishi, is that their anonymous nature make them mere "toilet graffiti". 2channel's anonymity is a departure from most English language internet forums which require some form of registration, usually coupled with email verification for further identification of an individual; its anonymity in part inspired the creation of 4chan. On 2channel, a name field is available, but it is seldom used. However, as open proxies such as the Tor network are banned from posting on 2channel, the administrators have some degree of ability to help law enforcement unmask users if necessary.

Revenue 
While 2channel and its successors are commercial, 2channel was moderated by volunteers. 2channel relied on advertisements from "obscure" companies. Between 2009 and 2012,  in ad profits were transferred to Nishimura's Singaporean shell company.

As early as 2004, companies such as Dentsu were data mining the website for their clients, keeping them informed of how they were being portrayed by 2channel users; by 2006, 75% of the content Dentsu analyzed on behalf of its customers was posted to 2channel.

2channel also received revenue from subscription services like the aforementioned maru. For its part, 5channel has a subscription service, that allows people outside Japan to post on it; this service also hides ads from its subscribers.

Matome
2channel historically allowed anyone to use its data, providing it in an easily parsable format; this made it simple to create third party "dedicated browsers" for posting on and using 2channel. In 2007, due to growing discontentment towards such sites, Nishimura added a board, /poverty/, which marked every post on it with the phrase . This caused many users to abandon other boards for that board.

Watkins made it a priority to combat "piracy" of 5channel by third-party matome sites in March 2014, adding tensai kinshi to many popular boards. Watkins followed up the rule change by restricting access to 2channel's data in March 2015, by requiring that dedicated browser authors use a special API to access 2channel's, and later 5channel's, thread data.

Phenomena

Densha Otoko
Densha Otoko is a Japanese franchise consisting of a movie, television series, manga, and other media, all based on the purportedly true story of a 23-year-old man who intervened when a drunk man started to harass several women on a train. The man ultimately begins dating one of the women. The event and the man's subsequent dates with the woman, chronicled on 2channel, directly inspired the franchise. Whether or not the original 2channel story is actually true is debated.

Shift_JIS art 

2channel and its successors, being textboards, cannot have images posted to them. Users get around this, however, by posting a more expressive form of ASCII art: Shift_JIS art. Below is a small sample:

Controversies

Slander and legal issues
During Hiroyuki's administration, he was often openly defiant of Japanese law, especially around libel, and his duty to follow it, telling Yomiuri Shimbun in March 2007:

By May 2008, Nishimura had lost more than fifty libel lawsuits in Japanese civil courts, and had been assessed millions of dollars in penalties; by August, according to him, he'd received more than one hundred lawsuits. While according to the official pages of the website, slander was prohibited, activists such as Debito Arudou claimed that the site did not actually respond to requests to delete posts in his case, returning mail unopened. After the transfer to Packet Monster Inc., Arudou, who had still not received any of the court ordered penalty, wrote in an op-ed that Nishimura had only transferred his assets to increase his "unaccountability". While Nishimura at that point had never paid any of the compensation courts ordered in his cases, in 2010 one of his plaintiffs was successful in getting compensated through the publisher of one of Nishimura's books.

Crime announcements 
Crime announcements were a regular occurrence on 2channel, including of mass suicides and murders. After the 2000 Neomugicha incident, in which a bus was hijacked by a man who posted on 2channel, police officers started regularly policing 2channel; such surveillance only increased after the Akihabara massacre announced his 2008 attack on 2channel as well. Former superintendent of the Tokyo Metropolitan Police Tateshi Higuchi called the site a "den of iniquity". According to The Japan Times, however, 2channel cooperated with police in the past to aid them in catching criminals using 2channel by giving police their IP addresses, from which their locations were determined.

Such crime announcements have continued to be a problem on 5channel: it was speculated that the man who carried out the Kyoto Animation arson attack posted an advance warning of the crime on 5channel.

Far-right nationalism and anti-Korean hate speech

2channel, with its massive size and anonymous posting, is abundant with slander, hate speech and defamation against public figures, institutions, and minority ethnic groups. Far-right users of 2channel are referred to as netto-uyoku, a term roughly analogous to "alt-right". Though the site has rules against posts illegal under Japanese law, the scale and anonymous nature of the site makes prompt deletions difficult to realize in practice. Furthermore, on occasion, 2channel has been accused of being reluctant to remove defamatory posts. The discussion boards are also often used to coordinate real-life demonstrations; as an example, 2channel users organized an August 2011 rally against Fuji Television, their complaint being that the channel was broadcasting too many Korean television shows. Sankei Shimbun reported in 2018 that 5channel, which received most of 2channel's users, has the same reputation for attracting netto-uyoku.

2channel netto-uyoku frequently make racist comments against Koreans. In 2009, it was even discovered that an Asahi Shimbun employee had posted racist remarks towards Koreans on 2channel. After the 2011 Tōhoku earthquake and tsunami, fake news proliferated on 2channel, falsely accusing Chinese and Korean people of "plundering" evacuation centers.

Technology 
It was a major departure from Usenet; however, when compared to other Japanese textboards at the time, such as Amezou, 2channel's format was not much different.

Boards in the textboard software have their threads sorted by the time of their last post, so making a post would "bump" (age) the thread to the top of the board index. Often, posters will use sage on purpose, to avoid unwanted attention.

Major outages

2010–2011 Korean DDoS 
In response to racism towards Koreans by 2channel users, especially against Yuna Kim, an athlete who defeated Japan in the 2010 Vancouver Olympics, the site suffered an extended outage in March 2010 due to a distributed denial of service (DDoS) attack conducted by a Korean hacking group. The attack against Jim Watkins' Pacific Internet Exchange LLC affected other sites on the shared network as well, including some belonging to US government agencies; it is estimated to have cost . Watkins requested the American government investigate the event as an instance of "cyberterrorism"; according to him, sporadic DDoS attacks by Koreans continued into 2011.

2015 8chan DDoS 
Beginning on 8 January 2015, 8chan, also owned by Jim Watkins and hosted on the network of N. T. Technology, Inc., suffered an outage due to a DDoS attack. Due to the attack, 2ch.net, then owned by Watkins but not yet operated under the name 5channel, went down as well. The attacks against the messageboards lasted until at least 13 January, leading "many 2channel users to become angry with the management".

Societal impact 
In September 2007, 2channel averaged over 2.4 million posts per day. As of July 2020, 5channel had 1,031 boards receiving around 2.7 million posts per day on weekends, with no growth since March 2016. Meanwhile, 2ch.sc then had 826 boards receiving around 5,700 posts daily. Due to its popularity, 2channel and its successors have had considerable influence on Japanese society.

Children's use of 2channel 
Use of sites like 2channel by minors is a major concern in Japan. In Tokyo, a local ordinance requires that internet service providers develop filters to prevent minors from accessing sites which could harm the "sound and wholesome fostering [of their youth]"; they must also confirm before installing a connection if any minors live in the household.

Despite this, however, web filter provider Net Star in February 2007 released the results of a survey which showed that the utilization rate of 2channel for primary and secondary students was 12.2%. In response to threads on 2channel about certain schools which were leading to cyberbullying, the Ministry of Education in 2008 released a 65-page manual for teachers and parents on how to handle the issue. Concerned about the popularity of 2channel among children and teenagers, a team of childhood education professors at the University of the Ryukyus in 2009 published a paper making recommendations to lawmakers on how to curb such use.

In February 2020, Nishimura himself wrote an op-ed in Nikkan Kogyo Shimbun warning parents about the dangers of allowing their children unfettered access to social media sites like YouTube and 2channel.

Politicians and 2channel 
Naoto Kan, a future Prime Minister who was then a member of the National Diet, sent a legal notice on 10 May 2000 demanding that 2channel delete a post by someone falsely claiming to be him.

After the Liberal Democratic Party presidential election in 2007, Prime Minister Tarō Asō stated in a Fuji TV interview that he sometimes posts on 2channel. During each election season, supporting posts for perennial candidates Matayoshi Jesus and Mac Akasaka were frequently made on 2channel, turning them into something of a meme, similar to the repeated candidacies of Vermin Supreme in the United States. After more than ten failed candidacies for various political offices, including Governor of Tokyo, Akasaka was eventually elected to the Tokyo Metropolitan Assembly, representing Minato, in April 2019. Asahi Shimbun credited Akasaka's online fame with helping him win the surprise victory.

2channel in the media 
Japanese news organizations often relied on 2channel to determine the issues the public was thinking about, and for leads. However, the mass media often reports on it negatively, similar to how it reported on otaku culture a decade ago, before it went more mainstream, even though internet trends nowadays routinely slip through into other media. The phrase "the online bulletin board says", when used in reporting, may refer either to 2channel or to other forums. Movements spawned on 2channel often receive media attention, noting how the methods of 2channel activists break socially normative behavior and bring pressure to bear through sheer numbers. Beyond this, though, 2channel posts were often a basis for media reports in Japan.

TV programs have even featured 2channel's moderators and users; comedian Hikari Ōta, for example, criticized Nishimura during a discussion on the Tokyo Broadcasting System's Sandējapon on the ideal limits of free expression as applied to social networks.

Weekly Bunshun (published by Bungeishunjū), meanwhile, has been criticized for being seen as overly pro-2channel and relying on its posts too much in its reporting.

See also

 Futaba Channel (2chan)
 Ilbe Storehouse, South Korea
 Shift JIS art
 Tianya Club, China

Footnotes

Explanatory notes

References

External links

  (5channel)
  (2ch.sc)

 
1999 establishments in Japan
Alt-right in Asia
Anonymous social media
Anti-Korean sentiment in Japan
Far-right politics in Japan
Internet properties established in 1999
Otaku
Racism in Japan
Websites with far-right material